Thru The Roof '83 was a various artists "hits" collection album released in Australia in 1983 on the CBS record Label (Cat No. ROOF 1). The album spent 5 weeks at the top of the Australian album charts in Dec. 1983 / Jan. 1984.

Track listing
Side 1:
1 Pat Wilson – "Bop Girl"
2 Dragon – "Rain"
3 Culture Club – "Karma Chameleon"
4 UB40 – "Red Red Wine"
5 Paul Young – "Wherever I Lay My Hat"
6 Mike Oldfield – "Moonlight Shadow"
7 Sharon O'Neill –	"Maxine"
8 Malcolm McLaren – "Double Dutch"
9 Michael Sembello – "Maniac"

Side 2:
1 Billy Joel – "Tell Her About It"
2 Michael Jackson – "Wanna Be Startin' Somethin'"
3 KC & The Sunshine Band – "Give It Up"
4 Cold Chisel – "No Sense"
5 Elton John – "I Guess That's Why They Call It the Blues"
6 Jon English – "Some People (Have All the Fun)"
7 Donna Summer – "She Works Hard for the Money"
8 The Blues Brothers & Ray Charles – "Shake a Tail Feather"
9 Austen Tayshus – "Australiana"

Charts

References

1983 compilation albums